Goumoens may refer to:

 The village of Goumoens-le-Jux in the Canton of Vaud, Switzerland
 The village of Goumoens-la-Ville in the Canton of Vaud, Switzerland
 The municipality of Goumoëns which was formed by the merger of Goumoens-le-Jux and Goumoens-la-Ville in the Canton of Vaud, Switzerland
Goumoens-le-Châtel, the former name of Saint-Barthélemy, Canton of Vaud, Switzerland

fr:Goumoens